The Passionate Strangers is a 1968 Philippine film produced by M. J. Parsons and was written and directed by Eddie Romero.  Cesar Amigo and Reuben Canoy wrote the screenplay, and Eddie Romero developed the story. Nestor Robles created the soundtrack for the film. It starred Michael Parsons, Mario Montenegro and Vic Diaz. Turner Classic Movies states the film was released in the United States in 1968 with a 78-minute running time.

Plot
When an old man who was working to settle a local labor dispute is murdered and his body is left lying along a roadside, everyone assumes the unsolved killing was ordered by union officials, and a riot ensues among the workers. In actuality, the old man was killed by a jealous husband named Adam Courtney (Michael Parsons) who was questioning him to learn if the old man's nephew was his wife's secret lover. A young boy is later charged with the murder, and the boy's friend Yoyong (who is the town drunk) begs Mr. Courtney to confess. Courtney's wife Margaret tells him to tell everyone that she was cheating on him and that the killing was accidental, but Courtney refuses to tell anyone in the town about her illicit relationship. He winds up being stabbed to death by Yoyong, which puts a quick end to the matter.

Cast
 Michael Parsons as Mr. Courtney
 Volora Noland as his wife Margaret
 Jose Dagumboy as Yoyong the drunk
 Mario Montenegro
 Butch Aquino
 Vic Diaz as the lawyer
 Celia Rodriguez
 Bong Calumpang as the young boy
 Claude Wilson
 Cesar Aguilar

References

External links

The Passionate Strangers at TCMDB

1966 films
Films directed by Eddie Romero
Films shot in the Philippines
Philippine drama films